David Cook is an American historian and professor of the history of Islam at Rice University. Cook earned his PhD at the University of Chicago.

Cook is noted among scholars of Islam for his "diligent reading and clear translations" of Islamic texts.

Books
 Studies in Muslim Apocalyptic. Princeton: Darwin Press, 2003, in the series "Studies in Late Antiquity and Early Islam".
 Contemporary Muslim Apocalyptic Literature. Syracuse: Syracuse University Press, 2005.
 Understanding Jihad. Berkeley: University of California Press, 2005.
 Martyrdom in Islam. Cambridge: Cambridge University Press, 2007.
 Understanding and Addressing Suicide Attacks (with Olivia Allison). Westport, CT: Praeger Press, 2007.

References

American historians of Islam
Rice University faculty
University of Chicago alumni
Living people
Year of birth missing (living people)